Colegio Guadalupe, S.C. is a private school in Lindavista, Gustavo A. Madero, Mexico City. It serves levels preschool through preparatoria (high school).

References

External links
  

High schools in Mexico City
Gustavo A. Madero, Mexico City